The 1988 Atlantic hurricane season was an event in the annual Atlantic hurricane season in the north Atlantic Ocean. It was an active season during which twelve tropical cyclones formed. The season officially began on June 1, 1988 and ended November 30, 1988. These dates, adopted by convention, historically describe the period in each year when most systems form.

Of this season's 12 named storms, 5 attained hurricane status, of which 3 became a major hurricanea storm that ranks as a Category 3 or higher on the Saffir–Simpson scale. The most notable storm in 1988 was Hurricane Gilbert, which was at the time the most intense hurricane in the Atlantic on record. Hurricane Gilbert caused about $5 billion in damage and 300 fatalities. The other notable storm was Hurricane Joan, which struck Nicaragua as a category 4 hurricane, and caused about $2 billion in damage and about 200 fatalities. Joan crossed into the Pacific and was renamed Miriam. As a result of their intensity, the names Gilbert and Joan were subsequently retired from reuse in the North Atlantic by the World Meteorological Organization.

This timeline documents tropical cyclone formations, strengthening, weakening, landfalls, extratropical transitions, and dissipations during the season. It includes information that was not released throughout the season, meaning that data from post-storm reviews by the National Hurricane Center, such as a storm that was not initially warned upon, has been included.

By convention, meteorologists one time zone when issuing forecasts and making observations: Coordinated Universal Time (UTC), and also use the 24-hour clock (where 00:00 = midnight UTC). In this time line, all information is listed by UTC first with the respective local time included in parentheses.

Timeline

May

May 30
18:00 UTC (2:00 p.m.

June
June 1
The 1988 Atlantic hurricane season official begins.
18:00 UTC (2:00 p.m. EDT) – Tropical Depression One makes landfall along the south coast of Mayabeque Province in Cuba.
June 2
00:00 UTC (8:00 p.m. EDT June 1) – Tropical Depression One dissipates over the Cay Sal Bank in the Bahamas.

July
No storms in the month of July.

August

August
Tropical Depression Two forms offshore South Carolina.
August 7
1200 UTC (8 a.m. EDT) – Tropical Depression Two strengthens into Tropical Storm Alberto.
0000 UTC (8 p.m. EDT) – Tropical Storm Alberto makes landfall in Nova Scotia.
August 8
0600 UTC (2 a.m. EDT) – Tropical Depression Three forms.

1200 UTC (8 a.m. EDT) – Tropical Depression Three strengthens into Tropical Storm Beryl.
1200 UTC (8 a.m. EDT) – Tropical storm Alberto becomes extratropical.
August 9
0000 UTC (8 p.m. EDT August 8) – Tropical Storm Beryl makes landfall in Southeastern Louisiana.
August 10
0000 UTC (8 p.m. EDT August 9) – Tropical Storm Beryl weakens into a tropical depression.
1800 UTC (2 p.m. EDT) – Tropical Depression Beryl dissipates.
August 12
Unknown time: Tropical Depression Four forms near the Bahamas.
August 13
Unknown time: Tropical Depression Four makes landfall near the Florida/Georgia.
August 16
Unknown time: Tropical Depression Four dissipates near Mississippi.
August 20
Unknown time: Tropical Depression Five forms.
Unknown time: Tropical Depression Six forms.
August 21
1200 UTC (8 a.m. EDT) – Tropical Depression Seven forms.

August 23
Unknown time: Tropical Depression Six dissipates as it headed towards Central America.
August 25
1200 UTC (8 a.m. EDT) – Tropical Depression Seven makes landfall near Santo Domingo, Dominican Republic with winds of 35 mph.
August 26
Unknown time: Tropical Depression Five degenerates into a tropical wave.
August 27
Around 0900 UTC (5 a.m. EDT) Tropical Depression Seven makes landfall in Andros Island with winds of 35 mph.
August 28
0600 UTC (2 a.m. EDT) – Tropical Depression Seven strengthens into Tropical Storm Chris.
Unknown time: Tropical Storm Chris makes landfall near Savannah, Georgia with winds near 50 mph.
August 29
0000 UTC (8 p.m. EDT August 28) – Tropical Storm Chris weakens into a tropical depression near Columbia, South Carolina.
August 30
Unknown time: Tropical Depression Chris makes landfall in Nova Scotia with winds of 35 mph.
North Carolina.
1800 UTC (2 p.m. EDT) – Tropical Depression Chris dissipates after emerging from Nova Scotia.
August 31
Unknown time – Tropical Depression Five dissipates again.
1800 UTC – Tropical Depression Eight formed in the Bay of Campeche.

September

September 2
0600 UTC – Tropical Depression Eight is upgraded to Tropical Storm Debby.
1800 UTC – Tropical Storm Debby is reclassified to Hurricane Debby.
September 3
0000 UTC – Tropical Depression Nine formed in the central Atlantic.
0000 UTC – Hurricane Debby makes landfall in Tuxpan, Mexico.
0600 UTC – Hurricane Debby weakens back to a tropical storm.
1800 UTC – Tropical Storm Debby weakens to a tropical depression.
1800 UTC – Tropical Depression Nine is upgraded to Tropical Storm Ernesto.
Unknown time – Tropical Depression Ten formed in the northern Gulf of Mexico.
September 4
Unknown time – Tropical Depression Ten makes landfall in Morgan City, Louisiana.
Unknown time – Tropical Depression Ten dissipates over the southern United States.
September 5
0600 UTC – Tropical Storm Ernesto is absorbed by a larger extratropical storm.
0600 UTC – Tropical Depression Debby emerges into the Pacific Ocean and is reclassified as Tropical Depression Seventeen-E.
September 7
0000 UTC – Tropical Depression Thirteen formed in the extreme eastern Atlantic.
0600 UTC – Tropical Depression Eleven formed in the central Gulf of Mexico.
1200 UTC – Tropical Depression Thirteen became a tropical storm but went unnamed.
1800 UTC – Tropical Depression Eleven is upgraded to Tropical Storm Florence.
September 8
1800 UTC – Tropical Depression Twelve formed to the east of the Lesser Antilles.
September 9
1800 UTC – The "Unnamed Tropical Storm" weakened to a tropical depression.
1800 UTC – Tropical Depression Twelve is upgraded to Tropical Storm Gilbert.
1800 UTC – Tropical Storm Florence is upgraded to a hurricane.
September 10
0000 UTC – The Unnamed Tropical Storm" dissipated.
0000 UTC – Hurricane Florence makes landfall on the Mississippi River Delta with winds .
0600 UTC – Hurricane Florence weakened to a tropical storm.
1200 UTC – Tropical Storm Florence weakened to a tropical depression.
September 11
0000 UTC – Tropical Storm Gilbert became strengthened into a hurricane.
1200 UTC – Hurricane Gilbert became a category 2 hurricane.
1200 UTC – Tropical Depression Florence dissipated over northeastern Texas.
1800 UTC – Hurricane Gilbert became a category 3 hurricane.
September 12
September 13
1200 UTC – Hurricane Gilbert became a category 4 hurricane.
1800 UTC – Hurricane Gilbert became a category 5 hurricane.
September 14
1800 UTC – Hurricane Gilbert weakened to a category 4 hurricane.
September 15
0000 UTC – Hurricane Gilbert weakened to a category 3 hurricane.
0600 UTC – Hurricane Gilbert weakened to a category 2 hurricane.
September 16
0000 UTC – Hurricane Gilbert strengthened into a category 3 hurricane.
September 17
0000 UTC – Hurricane Gilbert rapidly weakened into a category 1 hurricane.
0600 UTC – Hurricane Gilbert weakened to a tropical storm.
1800 UTC – Tropical Storm Gilbert weakened to a tropical depression.
September 19
1200 UTC – Tropical Depression Gilbert dissipated over Texas.
1800 UTC – Tropical Depression Fourteen formed.
September 20
0600 UTC – Tropical Depression Fourteen is upgraded to Tropical Storm Helene.
September 21
1200 UTC – Tropical Storm Helene strengthened into Hurricane Helene.
September 22
0600 UTC – Hurricane Helene becomes a category 2 hurricane.
1800 UTC – Hurricane Helene strengthened into a category 3 hurricane.
September 23
1200 UTC – Hurricane Helene becomes a category 4 hurricane.
September 24
1200 UTC – Hurricane Helene weakened back to a category 3 hurricane.
September 25
1200 UTC – Hurricane Helene weakened back to a category 2 hurricane.
September 26
1200 UTC – Hurricane Helene weakened back to a category 1 hurricane.
September 28
1800 UTC – Hurricane Helene re-strengthened into a category 2 hurricane.
1800 UTC – Tropical Depression Sixteen formed in the southern portion of the North Atlantic.
September 29
1800 UTC – Hurricane Helene weakened back to a category 1 hurricane.
September 30
1200 UTC – Hurricane Helene became extratropical.
1800 UTC – Tropical Depression Sixteen is upgraded to Tropical Storm Isaac.

October

October 1
0000 UTC – Tropical Storm Isaac reached peak intensity; maximum sustained winds were at 45 mph and the minimum central pressure was at 1005 mbar.
1200 UTC (8 p.m. EDT) – Tropical Depression Isaac dissipates near Grenada.
October 10
1800 UTC (2 p.m. EDT) – Tropical Depression Seventeen forms.
October 11
0600 UTC (2 a.m. EDT) – Tropical Depression Seventeen strengthens into Tropical Storm Joan.
October 17
0000 UTC (8 p.m. EDT October 16) – Tropical Storm Joan makes landfall in Venezuela with winds of 60 mph.
0600 UTC (2 a.m. EDT) – Tropical Storm Joan makes landfall in the Guajira Peninsula in Venezuela with winds of 65 mph.
October 18
0000 UTC (8 p.m. EDT October 17) – Tropical Storm Joan strengthens into Hurricane Joan.
October 19
0000 UTC (8 p.m. EDT October 18) – Hurricane Joan strengthens into a category 2 hurricane.
October 20
Unknown time: Tropical Depression Eighteen forms north of Colombia.
0000 UTC (8 p.m. EDT October 19) – Hurricane Joan strengthens into a category 3 hurricane.
0600 UTC (2 a.m. EDT) – Hurricane Joan weakens to a category 2 hurricane.
October 21
Unknown time: Tropical Depression Eighteen dissipates.
0000 UTC (8 p.m. EDT October 20) – Hurricane Joan weakens into a category 1 hurricane.
0600 UTC (2 a.m. EDT) – Hurricane Joan strengthens back to a category 2 hurricane.
October 22
0000 UTC (8 p.m. EDT October 21) – Hurricane Joan strengthens to a category 4 hurricane.
1100 UTC (7 a.m. EDT) – Hurricane Joan makes landfall south of Bluefields, Nicaragua with winds at 145 mph.
1800 UTC (2 p.m. EDT) – Hurricane Joan rapidly weakened to a category 1 hurricane.
October 23
0600 UTC (2 a.m. EDT) – Hurricane Joan weakens to a tropical storm and exits into the Pacific Ocean, Tropical Storm Joan is renamed Tropical Storm Miriam.

November

November 17
1700 UTC (1 p.m. EDT) – Tropical Depression Twelve forms in the central Caribbean Sea.

November 20
0500 UTC (1 a.m. EDT) – Tropical Depression Twelve strengthens into Tropical Storm Keith.
November 21
0800 UTC (4 a.m. EDT) – Tropical Storm Keith makes landfall in the Yucatán Peninsula with winds of 70 mph.
0500 UTC (1 a.m. EDT) – Tropical Storm Keith makes landfall in Sarasota, Florida with winds of 65 mph.
November 24
1700 UTC (1 p.m. EDT) – Tropical Storm Keith becomes extratropical while about 145 miles northwest of Bermuda.
November 30
The 1988 Atlantic hurricane season officially ends.

See also 

Lists of Atlantic hurricanes

References

External links
 nhc.noaa.gov, National Hurricane Center homepage

1988 Atlantic hurricane season
Articles which contain graphical timelines